Glyphostoma dedonderi is a species of sea snail, a marine gastropod mollusk in the family Clathurellidae.

Description
The size of an adult shell varies between 22 mm and 32 mm.

Distribution
This species occurs in the Pacific Ocean off the Philippines and Indonesia.

References

 Goethaels R. & Monsecour D. (2008) A new species of Glyphostoma (Gastropoda: Clathurellidae) from the Philippine Islands. Visaya 2(3): 33–36

External links
 

dedonderi
Gastropods described in 2008